Sam Huard is an American football quarterback for the Cal Poly Mustangs. He previously played for the Washington Huskies.

Early life and high school
Huard grew up in Bellevue, Washington and attended John F. Kennedy Catholic High School. He was named the MaxPreps National Freshman of the Year after passing for 3,432 yards and 34 touchdowns. Huard completed 248 of 395 passes for 4,141 yard with 42 touchdowns and 10 interceptions during his sophomore season. He completed 269 of 426 passes for 4,172 yards with 56 touchdowns and 11 interceptions as a junior and was named the Area Offensive Player of the Year by The Seattle Times and the 4A State Player of the Year by the Associated Press. Huard passes 1,473 yards and 21 touchdowns with no interceptions during his senior season, which was postponed from the fall to the spring of 2021 due to COVID-19. He also was invited to play in the 2021 All-American Bowl. Huard finished his high school career with a state record 13,214 passing yards and threw 153 touchdown passes.

Huard was initially rated a four-star recruit. He committed to play college football at Washington as a sophomore over offers from Boise State, California, Florida, Tennessee, and Washington State. Huard was re-rated as a five-star recruit during his senior year.

College career

Washington 
Huard entered his freshman season at Washington as the Huskies second-string quarterback behind Dylan Morris. He appeared in four games during the season, completing 22-for-42 pass attempts for 241 yards with one touchdown and four interceptions. Huard made his first career start in the Apple Cup rivalry game at the end of the 2021 season, completing 17-of-31 pass attempts for 190 yards and one touchdown with four interceptions in a 40-13 loss to Washington State. In 2022, Huard served as the third-string quarterback behind transfer Michael Penix Jr. and Morris. Following the end of the season, he entered the NCAA transfer portal.

Cal Poly 
Huard ultimately transferred to Cal Poly-San Luis Obispo. The transfer reuinited him with his former head coach at Kennedy Catholic, Sheldon Cross, who had recently been hired as the Mustangs' offensive coordinator.

Personal life
Huard is the son of former Washington and NFL quarterback Damon Huard. His uncle, Brock Huard, also played quarterback at Washington and in the NFL. Another uncle, Luke Huard, played quarterback at North Carolina and is currently a member of the USC Trojans coaching staff.

References

External links
Washington Huskies bio

Living people
Players of American football from Washington (state)
American football quarterbacks
Washington Huskies football players
Cal Poly Mustangs football players
Sportspeople from Bellevue, Washington
Year of birth missing (living people)